Lucie Zedníčková (born 15 November 1968) is a Czech actress. She performed in more than twenty films since 1979, and several television series.

Selected filmography

References

External links
 

 
1968 births
Living people
Czech film actresses
Actresses from Prague
Czech television actresses